The 4th Japan-Taiwan Jingying was held on 4–5 June 2011. Chen Shiyuan was the winner of the tournament, defeating compatriot Lin Zhihan in the final.

Tournament

References

2011 in go
International Go competitions